Barry Hiern (born 8 August 1951) is an Australian cricketer. He played in thirteen first-class matches for South Australia between 1972 and 1974.

See also
 List of South Australian representative cricketers

References

External links
 

1951 births
Living people
Australian cricketers
South Australia cricketers
Cricketers from Adelaide